"Can't Help Myself" is the first single released by the Australian synthpop/rock band Flowers, later known as Icehouse. It was released in May 1980 as a 7" vinyl single on independent label, Regular Records, five months ahead of debut album Icehouse. A 10" vinyl single was released in July and had a cover depicting individual images of band members diagonally across the band's name and the single's title (see infobox at right middle). It peaked at #10 on the Australian Singles Charts.

The music video was filmed in 1980 in a car park in Chatswood, Sydney.

It was also released in the UK on Chrysalis Records in October 1981 as the second single under the band name Icehouse (see infobox at right below) as both a 7" and 10" vinyl single and later in the U.S. as a 7" and 12" single. A remix version by Australian Trance DJ, beXta, was released on the Icehouse album Meltdown in 2002.

In January 2018, as part of Triple M's "Ozzest 100", the 'most Australian' songs of all time, "Can't Help Myself" was ranked number 85.

Reception
In a single review Cash Box magazine called it "a quick stepping rhythm embellished by both guitar and synthesiser, draws the listener in."

Track listing
All tracks written by Iva Davies (as Ivor Arthur Davies) unless otherwise indicated.

7" single (Australian release)
 "Can't Help Myself" - 3:10
 "Send Somebody" (Iva Davies, Michael Hoste) - 3:42

10" single (Australian release)
 "Can't Help Myself"
 "Send Somebody" (Davies, Hoste)
 "Can't Help Myself" (Extended version)

7" single (UK release)
 "Can't Help Myself" (Club Mix 1) - 3:27
 "Fatman" - 3:50

12" single (UK release)
 "Can't Help Myself" (Club Mix 1)
 "Can't Help Myself" (Club Mix 2)
 "Fatman"

12" single (US release)
 "Can't Help Myself" (Version 1) - 5:56
 "Can't Help Myself" (Version 2) - 5:56

Personnel
Credits:

Flowers members
Iva Davies – vocals, guitar, oboe, keyboards
Michael Hoste – keyboards
John Lloyd – drums, backing vocals
Keith Welsh – bass guitar, backing vocals

Recording details
Engineer: John Bee, David Cafe, Gerry Nixon
Producer: Cameron Allan, Iva Davies
Studios: Studios 301 except "Can't Help Myself" and "Send Somebody", recorded at Paradise Studios.
Re-mix — Ed Thacker, Daniel Coulombe
Mastering: David Hemming, Rick O'Neil

Charts

Weekly charts

Year-end charts

References

1980 debut singles
Icehouse (band) songs
Songs written by Iva Davies
1980 songs
Chrysalis Records singles
Regular Records singles